The Senior League World Series – Asia-Pacific Region (formerly the Far East Region) is one of six international regions that currently send teams to the World Series in Easley, South Carolina. The region's participation in the Senior League World Series (SLWS) dates back to 1972. 

It has produced the most championships (17) of any region, all won by Taiwan. Taiwan won nine straight titles from 1972–1980, the longest streak for any Little League division. Taiwan has not competed at the Senior League level since 1996. They won every regional tournament they entered.

Asia-Pacific Region Countries

Region Champions
As of the 2022 Senior League World Series.

Results by Country
As of the 2022 Senior League World Series.

See also
Asia-Pacific Region in other Little League divisions:
Little League — Far East (defunct)
Asia-Pacific & Middle East
Japan
Intermediate League
Junior League
Big League

References

Senior League World Series
Asia-Pacific